Kevin David Medina Rentería (born 9 March 1993) is a Colombian professional footballer who plays as a centre-back for Azerbaijan Premier League club Qarabağ.

Career
On 19 July 2020, Medina signed a three-year contract with Qarabağ FK.

Career statistics

References

1993 births
Living people
Colombian footballers
Association football defenders
Associação Naval 1º de Maio players
S.U. Sintrense players
C.D. Pinhalnovense players
Académico de Viseu F.C. players
G.D. Chaves players
Qarabağ FK players
Campeonato de Portugal (league) players
Liga Portugal 2 players
Azerbaijan Premier League players
Colombian expatriate footballers
Colombian expatriate sportspeople in Portugal
Expatriate footballers in Portugal
Colombian expatriate sportspeople in Azerbaijan
Expatriate footballers in Azerbaijan